John Reilly is a real estate broker and member of the California and Hawaii State Bar, specializing in real estate conveyance.  Reilly has authored numerous articles and books on the subject of real estate, in addition to serving as an adjunct professor of Real Estate Law at the University of Hawaii William S. Richardson School of Law for ten years.  Reilly, with partners Saul Klein and Mike Barnett, co-founded Real Estate Electronic Publishing, developers of the National Association of Realtors' e-Pro Internet professional certification.

Publications
 Language of Real Estate, 6th ed., 2006. 
 Real Estate Technology Guide, 2006. 
 Agency Relationships in Real Estate, 1994.

References

External links
 John Reilly's web site
 Real Estate Electronic Publishing Co., dba InternetCrusade.com

Living people
Year of birth missing (living people)